Prokop may mean either of two Hussite generals, both of whom died in the 1434 battle of Lipan:
 Prokop the Great
 Prokop the Lesser

Other people who bore the name Prokop:
 Procopius, 6c historian
 Saint Prokop, or Procopius of Sázava (died 1053), a Czech saint
 Prokop, bishop of Kraków (1292–1294)
 Adolf Prokop, German football referee
 Bohumír Prokop, Czech handballer
 František Prokop, Czech sport shooter
 Gerhard Prokop, German football manager
 Gert Prokop, German writer
 Hubert Prokop (basketball), Czech basketball player
 Joe Prokop (born 1960), American football player
 Joe Prokop (halfback) (1921–1995), American football player
 Ladislav Prokop, Czech basketball player
 Liese Prokop, Austrian athlete and politician
 Luke Prokop (born 2002), Canadian ice hockey player
 Martin Prokop, Czech rally driver
 Matt Prokop, American actor
 Skip Prokop, Canadian musician
 Stanley A. Prokop, U.S. Congressman for Pennsylvania (1959–1961)

Places
 Prokop (Belgrade), urban neighborhood of Belgrade, Serbia
 Prokop railway station in Belgrade, Serbia

Surnames from given names